Miguel Rahiece Cunningham (born 6 February 1997), known professionally as M1llionz, is a British rapper from Birmingham, West Midlands.

Career
Born in Handsworth, M1llionz spent some of his childhood in Birmingham but returned to his home area, where he developed his sound with influence from his Jamaican roots. This included the dancehall music which his parents played when he was growing up. He landed a top 40 single, "B1llionz", in 2020, his first song to chart in the UK. His breakthrough single was "North-West", released at the end of 2019 and he also made an impact with his drill anthem "Y Pree" in 2020. His debut mixtape Provisional License was released on 17 September 2021, with features from Headie One, AJ Tracey, Lotto Ash, and Jevon.

Discography

Mixtapes

Singles

As lead artist

As featured artist

Guest appearances

References

1997 births
Living people
21st-century British rappers
UK drill musicians
Black British male rappers
English male rappers
Gangsta rappers
Rappers from Birmingham, West Midlands